Philip Schultz (born 1945 in Rochester, New York) is an American poet. His poetry collection Failure won the 2008 Pulitzer Prize for Poetry. Schultz is also the founder and director of The Writers Studio, a private school for fiction and poetry writing based in New York City.

Biography 
A graduate of the Iowa Writers' Workshop, his work has been published in The New Yorker, The Paris Review, Slate, Poetry magazine, The Gettysburg Review, The Southern Review, and Five Points, among others, and he is the recipient of a Fulbright Fellowship in Poetry to Israel and a 2005 Guggenheim Fellowship in Poetry. He has also received, among other honors, a National Endowment for the Arts Fellowship in Poetry (1981), a New York Foundation for the Arts Fellowship in Poetry (1985), as well as the Levinson Prize from Poetry magazine. Schultz is also the author of The Wherewithal W.W. Norton, published in February 2014, as well as two memoirs, My Dyslexia, published by W.W. Norton in 2011 and Comforts of the Abyss: The Art of Persona Writing, published by W.W. Norton in 2022.

Schultz is the author of several collections of poetry, including The God of Loneliness, Selected and New Poems (Houghton Mifflin Harcourt, 2010); Failure (Harcourt, 2007), winner of the 2008 Pulitzer Prize in Poetry; Living in the Past (Harcourt, 2004); and The Holy Worm of Praise (Harcourt, 2002). He is also the author of Deep Within the Ravine Viking Penguin, 1984), which was the Lamont Poetry Selection of the Academy of American Poets; Like Wings (Viking Penguin, 1978, winner of an American Academy & Institute of Arts and Letters Award as well as a National Book Award nomination), and the poetry chapbook, My Guardian Angel Stein (1986).

Bibliography
Like Wings, Viking Penguin, 1978
Deep Within the Ravine, Viking Penguin, 1984
My Guardian Angel Stein, State Street Press, 1986
The Holy Worm of Praise, Harcourt, 2002
Living in the Past, Harcourt, 2004
Failure, Harcourt, 2007
The God of Loneliness: Selected and New Poems, Houghton Mifflin Harcourt, 2010
My Dyslexia, W. W. Norton & Company, 2011
The Wherewithal, W. W. Norton & Company, 2014
Luxury, W.W. Norton & Company, 2018
Comforts of the Abyss, W.W. Norton & Company, 2022

References

The Writers Studio: Director's page
"The 2008 Pulitzer Prize Winner in Fiction". www.pulitzer.org. Retrieved 2022-05-25.

External links
The Writers Studio

1945 births
Living people
Pulitzer Prize for Poetry winners
Iowa Writers' Workshop alumni
Writers from Rochester, New York
Chapbook writers
San Francisco State University alumni
Fulbright alumni